Jančar is a surname. Notable people with the surname include:

Drago Jančar (born 1948), Slovenian writer, playwright, and essayist
Lizika Jančar (1919-1943), Slovene partisan
Tom Jancar (born 1950), American contemporary art dealer

See also
Jancar Kuhlenschmidt Gallery, a contemporary art gallery in Los Angeles, California